Upton Sinclair Presents William Fox is a 1933 non-fiction work by the American writer Upton Sinclair. Sinclair based the book on a series of interviews he had conducted with William Fox, a former Hollywood film tycoon. The title was a reference to the screen credit "William Fox Presents" which appeared at the start of films.

Fox spoke on wide-ranging terms, particularly his childhood and his building of Fox Film into one of the major studios. Much of the book was devoted to detailing what he believed was a conspiracy by Wall Street to force him from control of Fox Film in 1930.

References

Bibliography
 Krefft, Vanda. The Man Who Made the Movies: The Meteoric Rise and Tragic Fall of William Fox. HarperCollins, 2017.
 Solomon, Aubrey. The Fox Film Corporation, 1915-1935: A History and Filmography. McFarland, 2011.

1933 non-fiction books
Books by Upton Sinclair